2GF is an Australian radio station based in Grafton, New South Wales operated by Broadcast Operations Group (Super Radio Network). It was opened on 15 December 1933 by Postmaster-General Archdale Parkhill.

Until 28 November 2022, the station broadcast on 1206 AM and on FM 103.9 to the Northern Rivers region of Grafton, Maclean, and Yamba. 
On 28 November 2022, 2GF commenced broadcasting to the Grafton RA1 licence area on a new frequency on FM 89.5 after being granted a licence to fully convert to the FM band by the Australian Communications and Media Authority.
2GF ceased to broadcast on 1206AM on 23 December 2022.

References

External links
Official web site

Radio stations in New South Wales
Radio stations established in 1933
News and talk radio stations in Australia
Classic hits radio stations in Australia
Broadcast Operations Group
Grafton, New South Wales